Agaricus subrufescens (syn. Agaricus blazei, Agaricus brasiliensis or Agaricus rufotegulis) is a species of mushroom, commonly known as almond mushroom, mushroom of the sun, God's mushroom, mushroom of life, royal sun agaricus, jisongrong, or himematsutake (Chinese: , Japanese: , "princess matsutake") and by a number of other names. Agaricus subrufescens is edible, with a somewhat sweet taste and a fragrance of almonds.

Taxonomy
Agaricus subrufescens was first described by the American botanist Charles Horton Peck in 1893. During the late nineteenth and early twentieth centuries, it was cultivated for the table in the eastern United States. It was discovered again in Brazil during the 1970s, and misidentified as Agaricus blazei Murrill, a species originally described from Florida. It was soon marketed for its purported medicinal properties under various names, including ABM (for Agaricus blazei Murrill), cogumelo do sol (mushroom of the sun), cogumelo de Deus (mushroom of God), cogumelo de vida (mushroom of life), himematsutake, royal sun agaricus, Mandelpilz, and almond mushroom.

In 2002, Didukh and Wasser correctly rejected the name A. blazei for this species, but unfortunately called the Brazilian fungus A. brasiliensis, a name that had already been used for a different species, Agaricus brasiliensis Fr. (1830). Richard Kerrigan undertook genetic and interfertility testing on several fungal strains, and showed that samples of the Brazilian strains called A. blazei and A. brasiliensis were genetically similar to, and interfertile with, North American populations of Agaricus subrufescens. These tests also found European samples called A. rufotegulis to be of the same species. Because A. subrufescens is the oldest name, it has taxonomical priority.

Description

The cap surface is covered with silk-like fibers, although in maturity it develops small scales (squamulose). The color of the cap may range from white to grayish or dull reddish brown; the cap margin typically splits with age. The flesh of A. subrufescens is white, and has the taste of "green nuts", with the odor of almonds. The gills are not attached to the stalk (free), narrow, and crowded closely together. They start out whitish in color, then later pinkish, and finally black-brown as the spores mature. Spores are ellipsoid, smooth, dark purplish-brown when viewed microscopically, with dimensions of 6–7.5 by 4–5 μm. Initially solid, the stipe becomes hollow with age; it is cottony (floccose) to scaly toward the base. The annulus is abundant and double-layered; it is bent downward toward the stem, smooth and whitish on the upper side, and covered with cottony scales on the lower side.

Agaricus subrufescens is edible, with a somewhat sweet taste and an almond aroma resulting from benzaldehyde, benzyl alcohol, benzonitrile, and methyl benzoate.

Distribution and habitat
Agaricus subrufescens forms fruit bodies singly or in clusters in leaf litter in rich soil, often in domestic habitats. Originally described from the northeastern United States and Canada, it has been found growing in California, Hawaii, Great Britain, the Netherlands, Taiwan, Philippines, Iran Australia, and Brazil.

Uses and safety concerns
Used in traditional and alternative medicine for its supposed anti-cancer effects, Agaricus mushrooms have not been assessed by sufficient high-quality clinical research to define safety and biological properties upon consumption as a food, dietary supplement, or drug. Preliminary research indicates Agaricus products may have toxic effects on liver function marked by increased serum level of liver enzymes, especially in people with ovarian cancer, and may cause allergic reactions. The U.S. Food and Drug Administration has issued warning letters to companies marketing Agaricus supplement products with unproven health claims of providing benefits to the immune system.

A type of ergostane-type compounds called blazeispirols have been isolated from A. subrufescens.

See also

 List of Agaricus species
 Medicinal fungi

References

subrufescens
Edible fungi
Medicinal fungi
Fungi of Asia
Fungi of Brazil
Fungi of North America
Fungi described in 1893
Taxa named by Charles Horton Peck